Eni Çobani (born 27 May 1972) is an Albanian lawyer and television personality. She is known for the programme E Diela Shqiptare, where she has been presenting the "Shihemi ne gjyq" section since 2011.

Çobani was born in Tiranë. After completing her high studies, she was immediately appointed lecturer at the Faculty of Law of the University of Tirana in the Department of Public Law.

Çobani is known for her performance on Tv Klan in E Diela Shqiptare since 2011 in her section "Shihemi ne gjyq" where she solves the conflicts and problems of people.

She married Avenir Shehu in 1997. They have a son.

References 

20th-century Albanian lawyers
Albanian television personalities
1972 births
People from Libohovë
Albanian human rights activists
Living people
Academic staff of the University of Tirana
21st-century Albanian lawyers